John Casey may refer to:
John Casey (academic) (born 1939), British academic and writer for The Daily Telegraph
John Casey (Chuck), fictional character portrayed by Adam Baldwin on the television show Chuck
John Casey (commentator) (born 1964), Australian journalist and sports broadcaster
John Casey (footballer) (fl. 1935–1941), Dumbarton FC player
John Casey (mathematician) (1820–1891), Irish geometer
John Casey (politician) (1823–1893), Newfoundland politician
John Casey (novelist) (born 1939), American novelist and translator
John Casey (rugby league), rugby league footballer of the 1920s and 1930s
John J. Casey (1875–1929), Democratic member of the U.S. House of Representatives from Pennsylvania
John Casey (climate change author), American author
John Casey (Australian convict) (died 1882), Irish rebel transported to Australia in 1826
John Keegan Casey (1846–1870), Irish poet, orator and republican
John Sears Casey (born 1930), member of the Alabama House of Representatives
Captain John C. Casey (19th century), who gave his name to Fort Casey in Florida
Jack Casey (John Casey, born 1935), member of the New Jersey General Assembly

See also
Jon Casey (born 1962), retired American ice hockey goaltender
John Kasay (born 1969), National Football League placekicker
Casey (disambiguation)
John (disambiguation)